James Joseph Murphy (born 1873) was an English footballer who played in the Scottish League for Hibernian, and in the Football League for Stoke and Woolwich Arsenal. He often went by the nickname Judge because he wore a wig.

Career
Murphy was born in Stockton-on-Tees but started his career in Scotland with Benburb, then joined Scottish League Second Division club Hibernian, where he made 70 appearances scoring twelve goals in four seasons. On 31 May 1894, he played in the final of the Rosebery Charity Cup against Hearts. Hibs won the match 4–2, despite an own goal from Murphy. He also featured in the finals of the competition in 1896 and 1897, both also against Hearts, with Hibs winning the latter.

Murphy joined Stoke in time for the 1897–98 season. Stoke struggled throughout the campaign and finished in bottom place. They entered the end of season test matches with Newcastle United and Burnley. Murphy played in all four matches including the final match against Burnley where both teams went into the match knowing that a draw would see them remain in the First Division and throughout the 90 minutes not a single attempt on goal was made. This led to the introduction of automatic promotion and relegation. He played nineteen times during 1898–99 scoring once and left the club in January 1899 to join Woolwich Arsenal. He joined Raith Rovers in October 1900, moving on to Cowdenbeath the following year. He appeared for Forfar Athletic during the 1902–03 season.

Murphy played for the Northern Football League in a Dundee vs. League Select game in April 1902, which was won by the latter 1–0. In December 1902, he played with Hearts of Beath against Cowdenbeath in the East of Scotland Qualifying Cup final. Cowdenbeath won 3–2.

Career statistics

References

1873 births
Year of death missing
Footballers from Stockton-on-Tees
Footballers from County Durham
English footballers
Association football wing halves
Benburb F.C. players
Hibernian F.C. players
Arsenal F.C. players
Stoke City F.C. players
Raith Rovers F.C. players
Cowdenbeath F.C. players
Hearts of Beath F.C. players